Sondes is a surname. Notable people with the surname include:

Baron Sondes
Earl Sondes 
George Milles, 1st Earl Sondes (1824–1894)
Viscount Sondes
George Sondes, 1st Earl of Feversham (1599–1677)
Sir Michael Sondes, MP (died 1617) of Throwley, Kent